The American city of Baltimore, Maryland, is notorious for its crime rate, which ranks well above the national average. Violent crime spiked in 2015 after the death of Freddie Gray on April 19, 2015, which touched off riots and an increase in murders. The city recorded 348 homicides in 2019, a number second only to the number recorded in 1993 when the population was nearly 125,000 higher.

Crime statistics 
In 2011, Baltimore Police Department reported 196 homicides, the city's first time having fewer than 200 homicides since having 199 in 1978. That number is far lower than the peak homicide count of 353 in 1993. The drop in 2011 was significant, when measured by the number of homicides, but the homicide rate was in the same range as the late 1980s when the city population was 130,000 higher. City leaders credited their sustained focus on repeat violent offenders and an increased community engagement for the continued drop, reflecting a nationwide decline in crime. However, Baltimore's decline was short-lived, as a reported 219 and 235 homicides were committed in 2012 and 2013, respectively. Baltimore's jump in homicides in 2013 defied regional and national trends.

Violent crime spiked in 2015 after the death of Freddie Gray on April 19, 2015, which touched off riots and a crime wave that has resulted in an increase in murders. The city recorded a total of 344 homicides in 2015, a number second only to the number recorded in 1993 when the population was 100,000 higher. This was the highest murder rate on a per capita basis ever recorded. Baltimore had seen 211 murders as of August 19, 2015, which equaled the total number of murders that occurred in Baltimore in all of 2014. On July 10, 2015, Mayor Stephanie Rawlings-Blake fired Police Commissioner Anthony Batts, saying his presence had become a distraction in a city that needs to focus on ending a dramatic spike in homicides. The city has taken steps to quell the increased violence by seeking assistance from the Federal Bureau of Investigation and other federal agencies, including embedding FBI agents in the city's police homicide unit. On November 13, 2015, the number of murders for the year reached (and the next day surpassed) 300 for the first time since 1999.

In an interview in The Guardian, on November 2, 2017, David Simon, himself a former The Baltimore Sun police reporter, ascribed the most recent surge in murders to the high-profile decision by Baltimore state's attorney, Marilyn Mosby, to charge six city police officers following the death of Freddie Gray after he fell into a coma while in police custody in April 2015. "What Mosby basically did was send a message to the Baltimore police department: 'I'm going to put you in jail for making a bad arrest.' So officers figured it out: 'I can go to jail for making the wrong arrest, so I'm not getting out of my car to clear a corner,' and that's exactly what happened post-Freddie Gray." In Baltimore, arrest numbers have plummeted from more than 40,000 in 2014, the year before Freddie Gray's death and the subsequent charges against the officers, to about 18,000 as of November 1, 2017. This happened even as homicides soared from 211 in 2014 to 344 in 2015 – an increase of 63%.

Baltimore's level of violent crime is much higher than the national average. In 2009, a total of 1,318,398 violent crimes were reported nationwide across the United States, equivalent to a rate of 0.4 incidents per 100 people.

Source:

Location 
Homicides in Baltimore are heavily concentrated within a small number of high-poverty neighborhoods. According to a Baltimore Sun investigation, around 80% of the city's gun homicides are committed in 25% of the city's neighborhoods. For the past few years, the rate of lethal shootings has been increasing in Baltimore and at least 10 other cities, such as Washington, D.C.; Chicago; and Milwaukee. , the Coldstream Homestead Montebello neighborhood in Northeast Baltimore was the city's most lethal neighborhood, with an average of one out of every two shootings being fatal; the citywide average is one in three.

Gang-related crimes are usually clustered in drug territories and mostly affect people involved in drug dealing, particularly narcotics and rival gangs.

Sandtown-Winchester, Baltimore, is one of West Baltimore's most blighted and problematic communities. In the second half of the 20th century, Sandtown experienced economic depression, housing abandonment, crime, and the effects of the Baltimore riot of 1968. Sandtown-Winchester was also the home of Freddie Gray and the scene of his arrest. Following his death, the area was hard hit by riots, including the looting and burning of a CVS drug store off the north-east corner of Sandtown-Winchester at the intersection of Pennsylvania and W. North Avenue.

Though the area was once considered middle-class, Berea has in the last century experienced economic depression, housing abandonment, crime, and the effects of the Baltimore riot of 1968. Its residents are largely lower-income African Americans. The neighborhood served as a filming location for the Baltimore-based HBO television drama, The Wire.

Policing 

The Baltimore Police Department is staffed by nearly 4,000 civilian and sworn personnel. These include dispatchers, crime lab technicians, chaplains and unarmed auxiliary police officers. During Martin O'Malley's administration as mayor, the department had become 43% African American.

In 2003, the FBI identified irregularities in the number of rapes reported, which was confirmed by then-Mayor Martin O'Malley. The number of homicides in 2005 appeared to exhibit discrepancies as well. Former police commissioner Kevin P. Clark said in an interview that the administration suppressed corrections to its crime reports; however, many of the charges made by the police commissioner now appear to have been politically motivated. The veracity of crime statistics reported by the Baltimore Police Department once again came under scrutiny in 2006, this time from Maryland legislators.

See also 

 2012 St. Patrick's Day beating
 Baltimore City Detention Center
 Baltimore Crew
 Baltimore riot of 1861
 Baltimore riot of 1968
 Baltimore riot of 2015
 The Block, Baltimore
 The Corner: A Year in the Life of an Inner-City Neighborhood
 Cop in the Hood: My Year Policing Baltimore's Eastern District
 Homicide: A Year on the Killing Streets, 1991 book by David Simon
 Homicide: Life on the Street, 1990s police drama TV series based on Simon's book.

References

External links 
 City-data.com - Crime in Baltimore, Maryland (MD): murders, rapes, robberies, assaults, burglaries, thefts, auto thefts, arson, law enforcement employees, police officers
 Crimebaltimore.com - Baltimore crime mapping resource & crime records
 Baltimore Police crime mapping tool
 Crime rates for Baltimore, MD

 
Baltimore